Kazimierz Jasiński (19 August 1946 – 25 January 2012) was a Polish cyclist. He competed in the Men's Road Race event at the 1968 Summer Olympics.

In 1968 he was also part of the Polish team that won the Peace Race coming 11th individually. He had won two Polish titles in the road team time trial.  He won a stage in the 1969 amateur Milk Race and the 1967 Baltic Sea Friendship Race. After his active career, he worked as a club coach, briefly in the US.

References

1946 births
2012 deaths
Polish male cyclists
Olympic cyclists of Poland
Cyclists at the 1968 Summer Olympics
People from Lipsko County
Sportspeople from Masovian Voivodeship
20th-century Polish people